Pucciniomycotina is a subdivision of fungus within the division Basidiomycota. The subdivision contains 9 classes, 20 orders, and 37 families. Over 8400 species of Pucciniomycotina have been described - more than 8% of all described fungi. The subdivision is considered a sister group to Ustilaginomycotina and Agaricomycotina, which may share the basal lineage of Basidiomycota, although this is uncertain due to low support for placement between the three groups. The group was known as Urediniomycetes until 2006, when it was elevated from a class to a subdivision and named after the largest order in the group, Pucciniales.

Ecology
Pucciniomycotina have a diverse range of ecologies as insect parasites, mycoparasites, and orchid mycorrhiza; some have been detected in soil and water or asymptotic members living on leaves. Most are plant pathogens. Many Pucciniomycotina are rust fungi and are placed in the order Puccinales that contains roughly 7800 species (c. 90% of the group). Some members of the group are of economical importance as a pathogen on a wide range of commercial plants, e.g. wheat. Pucciniomycotina is a cosmopolite and exists all over the world.

Morphology

There is a high morphological diversity in the Pucciniomycontina. The sporulating forms range from macrobasidiocarp to single-celled yeasts. The presence of simple septal pores unites Pucciniomycotina and distinguishes it from the sister groups. The predominance of mannose in the cell walls is also a uniting feature of the group.

Life cycle

Some members are only known from their anamorphs, and asexual stages predominate in most; in some species this is the only known form. A striking characteristic of Puccinomycotina is the unique developmental pattern. Rust Fungi or plant pathogenic members in Puccinales have the most complex life cycles known in the fungal kingdom, with five different spore stages. Studies have shown that Puccinales also has one of the largest genomes in the fungi kingdom, and that genome size expansion may be common. This explains the complex life cycles within the group.

References

Other sources
 M.C. Aime et al.: An overview of the higher level classification of Pucciniomycotina based on combined analyses of nuclear large and small subunit rDNA sequences. Mycologia, Band 98, 2006, S. 896–905.
 Robert Bauer, Dominik Begerow, José Paulo Sampaio, Michael Weiβ, Franz Oberwinkler: The simple-septate basidiomycetes: a synopsis. Mycological Progress, Band 5, 2006, S. 41–66, .

External links
 Tree of Life Pucciniomycotina
 http://website.nbm-mnb.ca/mycologywebpages/NaturalHistoryOfFungi/PucciniomycotinaDiscussion.html
 http://tolweb.org/Pucciniomycotina/20528

 
Taxa named by Franz Oberwinkler
Taxa described in 2006